Lavinia's Tongue is the debut solo album by Sook-Yin Lee, released in 1994 on Zulu Records.

Track listing

 "Dreaming Out Loud" (4:37)
 "The Hair Song" (4:05)
 "Striptease" (3:00)
 "Going Home to Spawn" (:27)
 "Lullaby" (2:54)
 "Your Noodle's Cooked" (1:24)
 "Sixty Miles Away" (5:19)
 "Staying In" (3:33)
 "Chinese Restaurant Muzak" (1:03)
 "Me and Mary Ann" (2:50)
 "We Didn't Know How to Play a Song" (2:20)
 "Mr. Noodle Theme" (1:23)
 "Quasimodo" (3:27)
 "Two Polaroids" (1:49)
 "I Think of You" (3:41)
 "Vocal Improv With Vibrator" (1:48)
 "Personality 46/64" (4:16)
 "Nothing" (2:58)

1994 debut albums
Sook-Yin Lee albums